Talaat Najm (born 18 September 1968) is a Lebanese former football referee who is currently the referee coordinator for the Lebanese Football Association. He refereed at the AFC Asian Cup, and had also been a regular referee at the AFC Champions League.

Honours
 Lebanese Premier League Best Referee: 2002–03, 2005–06, 2006–07, 2007–08, 2008–09

References

1968 births
Living people
People from Nabatieh
Lebanese football referees
AFC Asian Cup referees